Mark Turpin may refer to:

 Mark Turpin (poet), American poet
 Mark Turpin (tennis), American tennis player